Dipsas latifrontalis, the broad-fronted snail-eater or  Venezuela snail-eater, is a non-venomous snake found in Venezuela and Colombia.

References

Dipsas
Snakes of South America
Reptiles of Colombia
Reptiles of Venezuela
Reptiles described in 1905
Taxa named by George Albert Boulenger